HMS M3 may refer to the following ships of the Royal Navy:

  (1915), a monitor initially named M3
 , the third M-class submarine

See also
 , a Swedish Royal Navy M-type minesweeper; see List of mine warfare vessels of the Swedish Navy
 HSwMS Visborg (M03) (1970), a Swedish Royal Navy minelayer

Royal Navy ship names